is a 2015 Japanese romance action comedy film directed by Shinsuke Sato. The film is a sequel of Library Wars (2013), with both films based on the light novel series Library War written by Hiro Arikawa and illustrated by Sukumo Adabana. The film was released on October 10, 2015.

Plot
It is a time in which the expression of thought is censored, and the media is tightly controlled. Bearing up under a harsh regimen of instruction under the terrifying Atsushi Dojo, Iku Kasahara is now a full-fledged member of the Library Defense ‘Task Force’, and divides her time between hard physical training and regular library work. Dojo and the rest of the Task Force are ordered to guard a public exhibition featuring ‘The Handbook of Library Law’, a book widely seen as the symbol of freedom, of which there is only one existing copy. The assignment seems easy enough, but this is in fact a trap designed to wipe out and thus disband the Task Force and restore a twisted society to the correct moral path.

Cast
Junichi Okada - Atsushi Dojo
Nana Eikura - Iku Kasahara
Kei Tanaka - Mikihisa Komaki
Sota Fukushi - Hikaru Tezuka
Naomi Nishida - Maki Orikuchi
 - Ryusuke Kenta
Tao Tsuchiya - Marie Nakazawa
Aoi Nakamura - Shuji Asahina
Kazuyuki Aijima - Hajime Biitani
Kiyoshi Kodama
Tori Matsuzaka - Satoshi Tezuka
Chiaki Kuriyama - Asako Shibasaki

Reception
Library Wars: The Last Mission grossed US$16.8 million in Japan.

References

External links
 

2015 action comedy films
2015 romantic comedy films
Films based on light novels
Films directed by Shinsuke Sato
Japanese action comedy films
Japanese romantic comedy films
Japanese sequel films
Toho films
Works by Akiko Nogi
2010s Japanese films
2010s Japanese-language films